The River Thrushel is a river in Devon, England.

The Thrushel runs westerly from its source near Meldon to Tinhay, where it joins the River Wolf.

The river is marked as Tinhay River on Donn's map of 1765.

Thrushel
3Thrushel